Fauji (translation: "Soldier") is an Indian Hindi-language television series following the training of an Indian Army commando regiment; It was Shah Rukh Khan's debut in television.  It aired on DD National in 1989, produced by New Film Addicts. It was directed by Raj Kumar Kapoor.

The story follows a new set of recruits as they begin their training to become commandos in the Indian Army. If you see the Maroon Beret and parachute insignia on their Training commander Major K.G. Naraynan the best guess is it's about the Indian Army Para SF training. The series shows the daily struggles of the recruits including physical training, the pranks they play on each other, and the punishments they receive from their officers.

Originally, Rakesh Sharma who played the role of Vikram Rai was supposed to be the hero of the serial. Shah Rukh Khan's character Abhimanyu Rai (supposedly based on  Lt. Col. Sanjoy Bannerji of the Bombay Sappers, Indian Army), was supposed to have been the second lead. However Lt. Col. Raj Kumar Kapoor said in an interview that the camera “loved him so much” that they had to change the script to prop up Khan as the lead.

Initially, Khan's role in the serial was to count the crows. He said, “I landed up on the sets of ‘Fauji’, because the house-owner that we were speaking to after we needed a smaller house post the demise of my father, got to know that I’d been in Mumbai to act, and he revealed that his own father-in-law was producing a TV serial.

"When I went there, Colonel Kapoor (producer-director) offered me this sweet role, where I make a mistake and the Major would ask me to go a tree and count the number of crows in it. Once I reveal there are four, he asks me to be ‘Saavdhaan’. I was embarrassed to go back and tell my mother that my role was all about counting crows.”

Vishwajeet Pradhan also made his debut with this serial.

Cast
 Rakesh Sharma as Maj. Vikram "Vicky" Rai
 Amina Shervani as Kiran Kochar
 Shah Rukh Khan as Lt. Abhimanyu Rai
 Manjula Avtar as Capt. Madhu Rathore
 Vishwajeet Pradhan as N/Sub. Yaseen Khan
 Sanjay Taneja as Nk. Kishore
 Vikram Chopra as Lt. Varuneshwar Singhji Parmeshwar Singhji Chauhan
 Gautam Bharadwaj as Lt. Peter Monteiro
 A. Kannan as Maj. K. G. Narayanan
 Ajay Trihan as Lt. Devender Singh
 Sonal Dabral as Lt. Arun
 Nikhil Dewan
 Neeraj Joshi as Lt. Neeraj
 Anupama Sahni as Parvati
 Sunil Bindrani as the best hero

Now all episodes are available on Amazon Prime and Jio Cinema

Episodes

References

External links
 

DD National original programming
1980s Indian television series
Indian drama television series
Indian military television series
1989 Indian television series debuts
Indian action television series